{{Infobox Christian leader
| type = Bishop
| honorific-prefix = His Excellency, The Most Reverend
| name = Robert Philip Reed
| title = Auxiliary Bishop of BostonTitular Bishop of Sufar
| image = Bishop Robert Reed.jpg
| alt = 
| caption = 
| church = Roman Catholic Church
| archdiocese = Boston
| diocese = 
| appointed = June 3, 2016
| enthroned = August 24, 2016
| predecessor = 
| successor = 
| other_post = Titular Bishop of Sufar
| ordination = July 6, 1985
| ordained_by = 
| consecration = August 24, 2016
| consecrated_by = Seán Patrick O'Malley, Arthur Kennedy, and Robert Deeley
| rank = 
| birth_date = 
| birth_place = Boston, Massachusetts, US
| death_date = 
| death_place = 
| nationality = 
| religion = Roman Catholic
| previous_post = 
| alma_mater = 
| coat_of_arms = 
| motto = Iesus sola nobis spes("Jesus is our only hope")
| ordinated_by = 
}}

Robert Philip Reed (born June 11, 1959) is an American prelate of the Roman Catholic Church. As of 2016, he is an auxiliary bishop of the Archdiocese of Boston and the president of the television network CatholicTV.

Early life and education
Robert Reed was born in Boston, Massachusetts, on June 11, 1959, to William and Jeanne Reed. He grew up in Swampscott, Massachusetts, and studied at St. John's Preparatory School in Danvers, Massachusetts. Reed prepared for the priesthood at Saint John's Seminary in Boston and the Pontifical North American College in Rome.

 Ordination and ministry 
Reed was ordained into the priesthood by Cardinal Bernard Law on July 6, 1985, for the Archdiocese of Boston at St. John the Evangelist Church in Swampscott. His first assignment as a priest was at Immaculate Conception Parish in Medford, Massachusetts. Reed has also served as pastor at several other parishes in Massachusetts: 

 St. Matthew in Dorchester
 Holy Ghost in Whitman 
 Good Shepherd in Wayland
 St. Mary in East Walpole
 Blessed Sacrament in Walpole 

In addition to parish assignments, Reed started a career in broadcasting for the archdiocese. Since the 1980's, he has presented a Sunday morning radio program, The Catholic Hour. Reed earned a degree in television management from Boston University, and joined the Boston Catholic Television Center, where he held the titles of director of educational development, assistant director, and director. Currently, Reed is the president of the CatholicTV Network and CEO of iCatholic Media, Inc.

Auxiliary Bishop of Boston
On June 3, 2016, Pope Francis appointed Reed as an auxiliary bishop of the Archdiocese of Boston and titular bishop of Sufar. He was consecrated on August 24, 2016, at the Cathedral of the Holy Cross in Boston by Cardinal Seán O'Malley. Currently, Reed serves as a vicar general and regional bishop of the west region of the archdiocese. In addition, he is chairman of the Committee on Communications and a member of the Committee on Migration, the Committee on Religious Liberty, and the Administrative Committee for the United States Conference of Catholic Bishops.

Reed currently serves as pastor of St. Patrick Parish and Sacred Heart Parish, both in Watertown, Massachusetts.

Media
Since being named president of CatholicTV in 2005, Reed has expanded the network and rebranded it as The CatholicTV Network, America's catholic television network. He has also expanded the staff and created shows and series for the network.

 Shows 
 Inter Nos House + Home Renewed This is the Day Viaggio a Roma WOW: The CatholicTV Challenge Books 
 Renewed: Ten Ways to Rediscover the Saints, Embrace Your Gifts and Revive Your Catholic Faith'' (2014):

Memberships 
Reed is a knight commander of the Equestrian Order of the Holy Sepulchre of Jerusalem and a patriotic (fourth) degree member of the Knights of Columbus.

See also

 Catholic Church hierarchy
 Catholic Church in the United States
 Historical list of the Catholic bishops of the United States
 List of the Catholic bishops of the United States
 Lists of patriarchs, archbishops, and bishops

References

External links

Roman Catholic Archdiocese of Boston Official Site

 

21st-century Roman Catholic bishops in the United States
American television executives
Roman Catholic clergy from Boston
Living people
1959 births
People from Swampscott, Massachusetts
Bishops appointed by Pope Francis
Members of the Order of the Holy Sepulchre